Živorad Smiljanić (6 February 1942, in Zaječar - 14 December 2018, in Apatin) was a Serbian politician, member of the Socialist Party of Serbia. Between 1997 and 2000 was the president of the Assembly of Vojvodina. Smiljanić has been the mayor of Apatin since 2004. He graduated the medical school and practiced medicine for 36 years as a Gynaecologist.

References

2018 deaths
Presidents of the Assembly of Vojvodina
People from Zaječar
People from Apatin
Politicians of Vojvodina
Socialist Party of Serbia politicians
1942 births